Ananda Marga Gurukula Teacher's Training College is an Indian teacher's training college, located in Ananda Nagar, Purulia, West Bengal. It was established in 2012. It received formal approval on 3 March 2014 by National Council of Teacher Education. It offers 2 years Bachelor of Education (B.Ed.) course. It is affiliated to Sidho Kanho Birsha University.

References

External links 
ncte.gov.in

Colleges_of_education_in_India
2012 establishments in West Bengal
Universities_and_colleges_in_Purulia_district